State Road 523 (NM 523) is an approximately   state highway in the US state of New Mexico. NM 523's western terminus is a continuation of 21st Street at the Clovis city limit, and the eastern terminus is at NM 108 north of Texico.

History
The portion of 21st Street in Clovis from NM 209 to the city line was originally NM 523, but was transferred to the city of Clovis on December 1, 1989 in a road exchange agreement.

Major intersections

See also

References

523
Transportation in Curry County, New Mexico